This is a list of English football transfers for the 2012 summer transfer window. Only moves featuring at least one Premier League or Championship club are listed.

The summer transfer window began once clubs had concluded their final domestic fixture of the 2011–12 season, but many transfers will only officially go through on 1 July because the majority of player contracts finish on 30 June. The window will remain open until 23:00 BST on 31 August 2012.

This list also includes transfers featuring at least one Premier League or Football League Championship club which were completed after the end of the winter 2011–12 transfer window and before the end of the 2012 summer window.

Players without a club may join at any time, and clubs below Premier League level may sign players on loan during loan windows. Clubs may be permitted to sign a goalkeeper on an emergency loan if they have no registered goalkeeper available.

Transfers

All players and clubs without a flag are English. Although Cardiff City and Swansea City are associated with the Welsh flag, they play in the Championship and the Premier League (of England) respectively, and so transfers related to them and another non-English club are included.

Transfers involving Major League Soccer clubs in the United States and Canada technically have the league as the second party and not the listed club. MLS player contracts are owned by the league and not by individual clubs.

 * Signed permanently on 1 July
 ** Signed permanently on 15 June.
 *** Signed officially on 13 July.

References

Specific

Transfers Summer 2012
Summer 2012
English